The seventh season of Winx Club premiered on Nickelodeon in Asia on 22 June 2015. It later aired from 21 September to 3 October 2015 on Rai Gulp in Italy, and from January 10 to April 10, 2016 on Nick Jr. in the United States. The season consists of 26 episodes.

Nickelodeon first announced the season at the 2013 San Diego Comic-Con, with the premiere tentatively scheduled for fall 2014. In a press release on April 7, 2014, Rainbow S.r.l. and Nickelodeon officially announced their continuing partnership on the seventh season, with the premiere now set for 2015. Iginio Straffi, the creator of the series, said of the season: "It will be a privilege to partner once more with Nickelodeon on this."

Production and broadcast
At the 2013 San Diego Comic-Con, Nickelodeon confirmed that a seventh season was in production, with the premiere tentatively scheduled for fall 2014. In a press release on April 7, 2014, Rainbow S.r.l. and Nickelodeon officially announced their continuing partnership on the seventh season of Winx Club, with the premiere now pushed back to 2015. Iginio Straffi, the creator of the series, said of the season: "It will be a privilege to partner once more with Nickelodeon on this."

The first episode aired on 22 June 2015, on Nickelodeon in Asia, followed by its broadcast on 21 September 2015 on Rai Gulp in Italy. As a cost-cutting measure, the CGI-animated segments and California voice cast from the previous two seasons were not used in this season (during its production, Rainbow was undergoing a multimillion-euro financial loss). Season 7 was animated entirely in 2D Flash animation, and Nick Jr. commissioned the cheaper New York facility DuArt to record the dub. As with the previous two seasons, the copyright to Season 7 is co-owned by Rainbow and Viacom.

Episodes

References

Notes

Winx Club